"The Jump Off" is a song by American rapper Lil' Kim, released as the first single on February 10 in 2003 from her third studio album La Bella Mafia. It was produced by Timbaland and features Mr. Cheeks. The single debuted at number 95 and climbed into the Top 20 at number 17 on the Billboard Hot 100.

Background
"The Jump Off" means something that gets the party going and is also slang for "the best". The chorus of the song interpolates the Lost Boyz's 1995 song "Jeeps, Lex Coups, Bimaz & Benz". Kim decided to incorporate the song for the hook because it was one of her favorite songs during that time and felt it fit the storyline, despite producer Timbaland saying she should do something else.

Music video
The music video for the song was filmed at "Capitale" in New York City. It was directed by Benny Boom.

Track listings
US remix promo CD
"The Jump Off (Remix)" (Clean) – 4:26
"The Jump Off (Remix)" (Dirty) – 4:26
"The Jump Off (Remix)" (Acapella) – 4:26

US promo CD
"The Jump Off" (Clean) – 3:54
"The Jump Off" (Instrumental) – 3:58
"The Jump Off" (Album Version) – 3:58

German promo CD
"The Jump Off" (7Gemini Remix) – 3:50
"The Jump Off" (Original Remix) – 3:53
"The Jump Off" (Tomekk Remix) – 4:10
"The Jump Off" (Nappy Doggout Remix) – 3:59

UK promo CD
"The Jump Off" (Clean Version) – 3:55
"The Jump Off" (Dirty Version) – 3:55

Maxi CD
"The Jump Off" (Original Remix) – 3:54
"The Jump Off" (Tomekk Remix) – 4:10
"The Jump Off" (7Gemini Remix) – 3:50
"The Jump Off" (Nappy Doggout Remix) – 3:59
Enhanced Video

Charts

Weekly charts

Year-end charts

Other versions
A remix featuring Mobb Deep was also released but was used as a promotional single. The remix retained the same beat as the original, as well as Mr. Cheeks with background vocals, but featured new verses from Kim as well as Mobb Deep. There is also an unofficial remix to this song which features T.I.

For her 2007 mixtape Playtime Is Over, Nicki Minaj made a cover of the song and renamed it "Jump Off '07".

References

2003 singles
Lil' Kim songs
Music videos directed by Benny Boom
Song recordings produced by Timbaland
Songs written by Timbaland
Songs written by Lil' Kim
2002 songs
Atlantic Records singles